"Gotta Be You" is a song by American pop group 3T. It was written by Max Martin, Herbert Crichlow and Denniz PoP. It was released in 1995 only in Europe. The album version features English producer Herbie (though he is not officially credited on the single) and is from the album Brotherhood.

Track list

CD single
 New Radio Edit (3:34)
 Eurodance Dream Mix Radio Edit (3:40)

Limited edition CD single
 Radio Edit (3:34)
 Eurodance Dream Mix (4:28)
 Black Radio Mix (3:55)
 Anything (3T & D.T. Mix) (4:49)

Maxi CD
 New Radio Edit (3:34)
 Eurodance Dream Mix (4:28)
 Maurice Joshua Remix (4:28)
 Extended Mix (5:31)

Charts

References

1996 singles
3T songs
Songs written by Max Martin
Songs written by Herbie Crichlow
Songs written by Denniz Pop
Song recordings produced by Denniz Pop
Song recordings produced by Max Martin
1995 songs
New jack swing songs

fr:Gotta Be You